Cleide Amaral (born 17 July 1967 in Campo Limpo Paulista) is a retired Brazilian athlete who specialised in the sprinting events. She represented her country at the 1996 Summer Olympics, as well as 1993, 1995 and 1997 World Championships. In addition, she won multiple medals on regional level.

Her personal best in the 100 metres is 11.38, set in 1995.

Competition record

References

1967 births
Living people
Sportspeople from São Paulo (state)
Brazilian female sprinters
Athletes (track and field) at the 1996 Summer Olympics
Athletes (track and field) at the 1987 Pan American Games
Athletes (track and field) at the 1995 Pan American Games
Olympic athletes of Brazil
Pan American Games medalists in athletics (track and field)
Pan American Games bronze medalists for Brazil
Medalists at the 1987 Pan American Games
Olympic female sprinters
20th-century Brazilian women